The Vic Open was an annual World Curling Tour event, that took place at the Club de curling Victoria in Quebec City, Quebec. The tournament was held in a round-robin format. The event occurred in 2012 and 2013.

Past champions
Only skip's name is displayed.

External links
Club de curling Victoria Website

Former World Curling Tour events
Sport in Quebec City
Curling in Quebec